Juan Carlos Fernández (born 25 October 1946) is a Bolivian footballer. He played in two matches for the Bolivia national football team in 1975. He was also part of Bolivia's squad for the 1975 Copa América tournament.

References

External links
 

1946 births
Living people
Bolivian footballers
Bolivia international footballers
Place of birth missing (living people)
Association football forwards
Club Bolívar players
Club Aurora managers